A Man Called E is Mark Oliver Everett's 1992 major-label debut album, and the first on which he used the pseudonym "E". (As Mark Everett, he had previously self-released the limited edition LP Bad Dude in Love in 1985.)

"Hello Cruel World" was released as a one-track single in 1992. "Nowheresville"/"Strawberry Blonde" was released in March of that year.

Background 
In 1987, Everett moved from his family home in Virginia and resettled in California. There, in 1991, he signed a contract with Polydor Records and released A Man Called E under the name E a year later. The single "Hello Cruel World" was a minor success. Touring to support the album, E opened for Tori Amos.

Everett became known as "E" because there were several people in his life at the time who had the same first name. While it may have caused some confusion in record stores and radio stations, the single-letter name gave the press a playful handle. This playfulness was evident in a review of the album by the eminent writer Daniel Levitin which began: "Excellent eponymous effort, energizingly eclectic. Early enthusiasm effectively ensures E's eminence."

Everett released one further solo album, 1993's Broken Toy Shop, before forming the band Eels in 1995.

Track listing
All songs written by E, except where noted
"Hello Cruel World" (E, Parthenon Huxley) – 3:50
"Fitting In with the Misfits" – 3:09
"Are You & Me Gonna Happen" – 3:00
"Looking Out the Window with a Blue Hat On" – 2:17
"Nowheresville" (E, Huxley) – 3:21
"Symphony for Toy Piano in G Minor" – 0:34
"Mockingbird Franklin" – 3:03
"I've Been Kicked Around" – 3:24
"Pray" – 2:46
"E's Tune" – 2:53
"You'll Be the Scarecrow" – 3:21

Personnel
E – lead & background vocals, electric & acoustic guitars, piano, Hammond B-3, keyboards, harmonica, accordion, drums, percussion, melodica, toy piano, programming

Additional musicians
Parthenon Huxley – acoustic & electric guitars, bass guitar, percussion, fingersnaps, programming
Jennifer Condos – bass guitar
Jim Lang – accordion, Hammond B-3, piano, keyboards, cuckoo clock, programming
Eric Williams – mandolin ("Nowheresville")
Danny Davis Jr. – electric guitar ("Are You & Me Gonna Happen")
Rockenspiel – glockenspiel

Production
Parthenon Huxley – co-producer
E – co-producer
Jim Lang – conductor (The Knobworld Symphony Orchestra), engineer, mixing
Bill Gable – additional engineer
Mikal Reid – additional engineer
Fen – additional engineer
Jesse Kanner – additional engineer
Opie – additional engineer
Stephen Marcussen – mastering
David Lau – artwork
Rick Dobbis – design
Bradford Walker Evans Hitz – photography
Thomas Nelson – photography
Lex – pin design

References

Further reading

External links 
 

1992 debut albums
Eels (band) albums
Polydor Records albums
Albums produced by Mark Oliver Everett